El Ten Eleven is the self-titled debut album from post-rock band El Ten Eleven.

Spin magazine called the album "a sort of Silverlake-style Sigur Rós... experimental instrumental music that's both highly skilled and deeply felt".

The album cover features a silhouetted trijet – however, it is a Boeing 727, not a Lockheed L-1011.

Track listing
"My Only Swerving" – 5:15
"Sorry About Your Irony" – 3:19
"Lorge" – 3:57
"1969" – 0:47
"Central Nervous Piston" – 4:50
"Thinking Loudly" – 4:24
"Fanshawe" – 5:12
"Connie" – 6:25
"Bye Mom" – 1:29

References

External links
 Amazon
 Apple Music
 Bandcamp
 MusicBrainz

El Ten Eleven albums
2004 debut albums